Chitistone Mountain is a 6,844-foot (2,086-meter) mountain summit located at the southeastern edge of the Wrangell Mountains, in the U.S. state of Alaska.

The mountain takes its name from the Chitistone River as reported in 1959 by the United States Geological Survey. In turn, the Chitistone River which is part of the Copper River drainage basin, was derived from "chiti," an Indian word for copper, added to the English word "stone."

The area west of this mountain at the Kennecott Mines was actively mining copper from 1911 through 1938.

Climate

Based on the Köppen climate classification, Chitistone Mountain is located in a subarctic climate zone with long, cold, snowy winters, and cool summers. Weather systems coming off the Gulf of Alaska are forced upwards by the Wrangell Mountains (orographic lift), causing heavy precipitation in the form of rainfall and snowfall. Temperatures can drop below −20 °F with wind chill factors below −30 °F. The months May through June offer the most favorable weather for viewing and climbing.

See also

Kennecott, Alaska
Geography of Alaska

References

External links
 Weather forecast: Chitistone Mountain
 Chitistone Mountain: Flickr photo

Landforms of Copper River Census Area, Alaska
Mountains of Alaska
Wrangell–St. Elias National Park and Preserve
North American 2000 m summits